The 1988 Virginia Slims of New England was a women's tennis tournament played on indoor carpet courts in Worcester, Massachusetts in the United States and was part of the Category 5 tier of the 1988 WTA Tour. It was the fourth edition of the tournament and was held from October 31 through November 6, 1988. First-seeded Martina Navratilova won the singles title and earned $60,000 first-prize money.

Finals

Singles

 Martina Navratilova defeated  Natasha Zvereva 6–7(4–7), 6–4, 6–3
 It was Navratilova's 8th singles title of the year and the 137th of her career.

Doubles

 Martina Navratilova /  Pam Shriver defeated  Gabriela Sabatini /  Helena Suková 6–3, 3–6, 7–5
 It was Navratilova's 15th title of the year and the 279th of her career. It was Shriver's 10th title of the year and the 113th of her career.

References

External links
 ITF tournament edition details
 Tournament draws

Virginia Slims of New England
Virginia Slims of New England
Virginia
Virginia